Yauri is a Local Government Area in Kebbi State, northwestern Nigeria. It is the location of the Yauri Emirate, one of the smallest historical emirates in Northern Nigeria.

Demographics
Yauri's ethnic groups include Shangawa, Gungawa, Dukawa, Kamberi, Hausa people, Nupe, Yoruba and Kanuri.  However, the predominance of Hausa's in the socio-political structure of northern Nigeria has gradually increased the transformation of some of the dominant ethnic groups in Yauri to become Hausanized. Today, the Hausa people constitute the governing class of Yauri.

The Reshe people consider Yauri to be their ancient city.

Today, the Hausa language is the main language.

Climate
The rainy season is usually between June and October, however, rain sometimes starts in April or May. During the rainy season most farmers favor harvesting their crops, planting crops and repairing the farms. Festivals and commemoration dominates the rainy season calendar. Harmattan is the other season

References

Local Government Areas in Kebbi State
Kebbi State